WV3 or WV-3 may refer to:
 Lockheed WV-3 Warning Star, a surveillance aircraft
 West Virginia's 3rd congressional district
 West Virginia Route 3
 West Virginia Route 3 (1920s)
 WorldView-3, a commercial Earth observation satellite
 WV3, a postcode district in Wolverhampton, England; see WV postcode area